Kamil Białas (born 21 August 1991) is a Polish former competitive figure skater. He is the 2010 Polish silver medalist and 2009 bronze medalist. He qualified for the free skate at the 2011 World Junior Championships in Gangneung, South Korea.

Programs

Competitive highlights
JGP: Junior Grand Prix

References

External links
 
 Kamil Białas at the UKŁF "Unia" Oświęcim

Polish male single skaters
People from Oświęcim
1991 births
Living people
Sportspeople from Lesser Poland Voivodeship